David McNeil(l) may refer to:
David McNeil (footballer) (born 1995), Scottish footballer
David B. McNeil (1818–1897), American politician from New York
Dave McNeil (1921–1993), English footballer
David McNeill (born 1933), American psychologist and writer
David McNeill (athlete) (born 1986), Australian long-distance runner
David A. McNeill, Irish journalist and academic